Ustilaginoidea is a genus of fungi in the family Clavicipitaceae. The genus contains 19 species. Ustilaginoidea was circumscribed by German botanist Julius Oscar Brefeld in 1895, with Ustilaginoidea oryzae assigned as the type species. Ustilaginoidea virens causes the disesase known alternatively as rice false smut, pseudosmut, or green smut.

Species
Ustilaginoidea albicans 
Ustilaginoidea arundinellae 
Ustilaginoidea bogoriensis 
Ustilaginoidea borneensis 
Ustilaginoidea congensis 
Ustilaginoidea dichromenae 
Ustilaginoidea flavonigrescens 
Ustilaginoidea oplismeni 
Ustilaginoidea penniseti 
Ustilaginoidea polliniae 
Ustilaginoidea reticulata 
Ustilaginoidea sacchari-narengae 
Ustilaginoidea setariae 
Ustilaginoidea usambarensis 
Ustilaginoidea virens

References

Clavicipitaceae
Hypocreales genera
Taxa described in 1895
Taxa named by Julius Oscar Brefeld